The Shire of Bulla was a local government area about  northwest of Melbourne, the state capital of Victoria, Australia.

History

The Bulla Road District was created on 16 September 1862. It became a shire on 9 March 1866. It gained some territory from the Shire of Broadmeadows in 1955, including then-rural areas such as Craigieburn. The Shire Offices were transferred from Bulla to Sunbury in 1956.

On 15 December 1994, the Shire of Bulla was abolished, and along with parts of the City of Broadmeadows north of the Western Ring Road and parts of the Cities of Keilor and Whittlesea, was merged into the newly created City of Hume.

Council met at the Shire Offices, in Sunbury. The facility is used today by the City of Hume, Western Water and VicRoads.

Wards

The Shire of Bulla was divided into four ridings on 1 April 1985, each of which elected three councillors:
 Bulla Riding
 Craigieburn Riding
 Sunbury East Riding
 Sunbury West Riding

Suburbs and localities
 Attwood
 Bulla
 Craigieburn (shared with the City of Whittlesea)
 Diggers Rest (shared with the Shire of Melton)
 Greenvale
 Kalkallo
 Melbourne Airport (shared with the City of Keilor)
 Mickleham
 Oaklands Junction
 Roxburgh Park
 Somerton (shared with the City of Whittlesea)
 Sunbury*
 Wildwood
 Yuroke

* Council seat.

Population

* Estimate in the 1958 Victorian Year Book.
+ Includes population gained from City of Broadmeadows in 1955.

References

External links
 Victorian Places - Bulla and Bulla Shire

Bulla
1862 establishments in Australia
1994 disestablishments in Australia
City of Hume